Hanqing Zhao (24 April 1994; Wuhan, China) is a Chinese draughts player (International draughts), who ranked second at the 2012 Asian Women's Draughts Championship. She became World Draughts Champion Juniors Girls 2012. She has become the champion of China many times. Zhao is an International master (MIF). At 7 years-of-age, she begin playing in checkmate. After that she started playing draughts.

World Championship
 2013 (12 place)
 2015 (7 place)
 2019 (7 place)

References

Chinese draughts players
1994 births
Living people